Patient advocacy is a process in health care concerned with advocacy for patients, survivors, and caregivers. The patient advocate may be an individual or an organization, concerned with healthcare standards or with one specific group of disorders. The terms patient advocate and patient advocacy can refer both to individual advocates providing services that organizations also provide, and to organizations whose functions extend to individual patients. Some patient advocates are independent (with no conflict-of-loyalty issues) and some work for the organizations that are directly responsible for the patient's care.

Typical advocacy activities are the following: safeguarding patients from errors, incompetence and misconduct; patient rights, matters of privacy, confidentiality or informed consent, patient representation, awareness building, support and education of patients, survivors and their carers.

Patient advocates give a voice to patients, survivors and their carers on healthcare-related (public) fora, informing the public, the political and regulatory world, health-care providers (hospitals, insurers, pharmaceutical companies etc.), organizations of health-care professionals, the educational world, and the medical and pharmaceutical research communities.

Nurses can perform a de facto role of patient advocacy, though this role may be limited due their position in an organization. Patients can advocate for themselves through self-advocacy and the ability for this self-advocacy can be learnt or improved through training.

History 
Patient advocacy, as a hospital-based practice, grew out of this patient rights movement:  patient advocates (often called patient representatives) were needed to protect and enhance the rights of patients at a time when hospital stays were long and acute conditions—heart disease, stroke and cancer—contributed to the boom in hospital growth. Health care reformers at the time critiqued this growth by quoting Roemer's Law: a built hospital bed is a bed likely to be filled.  And more radical health analysts coined the term "health empires" to refer to the increasing power of these large teaching institutions that linked hospital care with medical education, putting one in the service of the other, arguably losing the patient-centered focus in the process.  It was not surprising, then, that patient advocacy, like patient care, focused on the hospital stay, while health advocacy took a more critical perspective of a health care system in which power was concentrated on the top in large medical teaching centers and a dominance of the medical profession.

Patient advocacy in the United States emerged in the 1950s in the context of cancer research and treatment. In those early days of cancer treatment, patients and their families raised ethical concerns around the tests, treatment practices, and clinical research being conducted. For instance, they expressed concern to the National Institute of Health (NIH) about the cruelty of the repeated collection of blood samples (for blood marrow examination) and raised questions about whether this was more harmful than beneficial to the patient. Sidney Farber, a Harvard physician and cancer researcher, coined the term "total care", to describe the treatment of children with leukemia. Under total care, a physician "treated the family as a whole, factoring in its psychosocial and economic needs", rather than focusing purely on physical health concerns. Previous researchers had dealt with concerns raised by families, because physicians emphasized patient physical health rather than the inclusion of bedside manners with the families. The practice of patient advocacy emerged to support and represent patients in this medico-legal and ethical discussion.

The 1970s were also an important time in the US for patient advocacy as the Patient Rights movement grew. As a major advocacy organization during the time, the National Welfare Rights Organization's (NWRO) materials for a patient's bill of rights influenced many additional organizations and writings, including hospital accreditation standards for the Joint Commission in 1970 and the American Hospital Association's Patient Bill of Rights in 1972.  The utilisation of advocates by individual patients gained momentum in the early 2000s in the US, and Australia 10 years later, and the profession is now perceived as a mainstream option to optimise outcomes in both hospital and community based healthcare.

Self-advocacy 

Communication skills, information seeking skills and problem solving skills were found to correlate with measures of a patients ability to advocate for themselves. Conceptualizations of the qualities have defined self-knowledge, communication skills, knowledge of rights, and leaderships as components of advocacy.

A number of interventions have been tried to improve patients effectiveness at advocating for themselves. Studies have found peer-led programs where an individual with a condition taught their interview skills where effective in improving self-advocacy. Writing interventions where people with conditions were taught to and practiced writing essays advocating for themselves were shown to improve self-advocacy.

Patient advocacy processes 
At a conceptual level patient advocacy consists of three processes: "valuing", "apprising" and "interceding". Valuing consists of understanding the patients unique attributes and desires. Apprising consists of informing the patient and advising the patient. Interceding consists of interacting with processes to ensure that the patients unique attributes and desires are represented in these processes, and may include interceding in family interactions as well as healthcare processes.

Examples of patient advocacy include:

 Educating and walking patients through the management of their disease or chronic illnesses. The social determinants of health can vary significantly from patient to patient. It is the role of the patient advocate to cater to the patient's needs and assist with these factors, such as where to find treatment to manage their illness, assisting with healthcare access due to socioeconomic barriers, or helping find additional health services. Assistance with the management of their illnesses or disease can also include assisting with cooperative purchases of health care materials.
Establishing a network of contacts. Examples of contacts patient advocates can assist in connecting patients to include: in the public sector (political and regulatory), in public and private health insurance, in the sector of medical service providers, with medical practitioners, and with pharmaceutical and medical research to provide patients with help in the care and management of their diseases.
Providing emotional support in dealing with their health concerns, illnesses, chronic conditions. According to the National Institute of Mental Health, individuals with chronic illnesses are at a higher risk of depression of than patients with other mental health conditions. When managing their illnesses, patients and survivors experience the direct effect of the consequences their disease has on their quality of life, and may also go through difficult phases of adaptation of their daily routine and lifestyle to accommodate the disease. Part of the role of patient advocates can include providing emotional support for patients or connecting them to mental health resources.
Attending appointments with a patient. Patients can find doctor's appointments intimidating, but also difficult to understand. Issues may stem from differences in language proficiency, educational background, or background in health literacy. A patient advocate's presence can ensure that patient's concerns are highlighted and adequately addressed by physicians. Patient advocates may also be responsible for assisting with scheduling additional appointments as well.
Assisting with health insurance and other financial aspects of healthcare. The Institute of Medicine in the United States says fragmentation of the U.S. health care delivery and financing system is a barrier to accessing care. Within the financing system, health insurance plays a significant role. According to a United Health survey, only 9% of Americans surveyed understood health insurance terms, which presents a significant issue for patients, given the importance of health insurance in terms of providing access to healthcare. The patient advocate may help with researching or choosing health insurance plans.

Nurse advocacy
The American Nurses Association (ANA) includes advocacy in its definition of nursing:

Advocacy in nursing finds its theoretical basis in nursing ethics. For instance, the ANA's Code of Ethics for Nurses includes language relating to patient advocacy:

 The nurse's primary commitment is to the patient, whether an individual, family, group, or community.
 The nurse promotes, advocates for, and strives to protect the health, safety, and rights of the patient.

Several factors can lead a patient to use nurses for advocacy including; impairments in their ability to express wishes such as die to speech impairments or limited consciousness; lack of independence due to illiteracy, sociocultural weakness; or separation from friends or family caused by hospitalization. Nurses are more able to advocate if they are independent, professionally committed, and have self-confidence as well as having legal and professional knowledge, as well as knowing a patients wishes. The act of patient advocacy improved nurses sense of professional well-being and self-concept, job motivation and job satisfaction, and enhances the public image of nurses however advocating for a patient could have social and professional consequences.

Conflict of interests between a nurse's perceived professional responsibilities and their responsibilities to the patient can be a barrier to advocacy. Additionally, a nurse is concerned about all of the patients they care for rather any individual patient. Gadow and Curtis argue that the role of patient advocacy in nursing is to facilitate a patients informed consent through decision making, but in mental health nursing there is a conflict between the patients right to autonomy and nurses' legal and professional duty to protect the patient and the community from harm, since patients may experience delusions or confusion which affect their decision making. In such instances, the nurse may engage in persuasion and negotiation in order to prevent the risk that they perceive.

Private advocacy 

Private advocates (also known as independent patient/health/health care advocates) often work alongside the advocates that work for hospitals. As global healthcare systems started to become more complex, and as the role of the cost of care continues to place more of a burden on patients, a new profession of private professional advocacy began to take root in the mid-2000s. At that time, two organizations were founded to support the work of these new private practitioners, professional patient advocates. The National Association of Healthcare Advocacy Consultants was started to provide broad support for advocacy. The Alliance of Professional Health Advocates was started to support the business of being a private advocate. Some regions require that those detained for the treatment of mental health disorders are given access to independent mental health advocates who are not involved in the patients treatment.

Proponents of private advocacy, such as Australian advocate Dorothy Kamaker and L. Bradley Schwartz, have noted that the patient advocates employed by healthcare facilities have an inherent conflict-of-interest in situations where the needs of an individual patient are at odds with the business interests of an advocate's employer. Kamaker argues that hiring a private advocate eliminates this conflict because the private advocate "…has only one master and very clear priorities."

Kamaker founded patientadvocates.com.au in 2013 and followed with disabilityhealthsupport.com.au in 2021 when research revealed that vulnerable groups achieved sub optimal outcomes and encountered barriers and prejudice in the mainstream health and hospital systems in Australia. " Based on the limited data available, we know that the overall health of people with disabilities is much worse than that of the general population" with "people with disabilities rarely identified as a priority population group in public health policy and practice". Patients supported by advocates have been shown to experience fewer treatment errors and require fewer readmissions post discharge. In Australia there has been some movement by private health insurers to engage private patient advocates to reduce costs, improve outcomes and expedite return to work for employees.

Schwartz is the founder and president of GNANOW.org, where he states, "Everyone employed by a health care company is limited to what they can accomplish for patients and families. Hospital-employed patient advocates, navigators, social workers, and discharge planners are no different. They became health care professionals because they are passionate about helping people. But they have heavy caseloads and many work long hours with limited resources. Independent Patient Advocates work one-on-one with patients and loved ones to explore options, improve communication, and coordinate with overworked hospital staff. In fact, many Independent Patient Advocates used to work for hospitals and health care companies before they decided to work directly for patients."

Patient advocacy organizations 

Patient advocacy organizations, PAO, or Patient advocacy groups are organizations that exist to represent the interests of people with a particular disease.  Patient advocacy organizations may fund research, influence national health policy through lobbying. Examples include American Cancer Society, American Heart Association, and National Organization for Rare Disorders.

Some patient advocacy groups receive donations from pharmaceutical companies. In 2015, 14 companies donated $116 million to patient advocacy groups.  A database identifying more than 1,200 patient groups showed that six pharmaceutical companies contributed $1 million or more in 2015 to individual groups representing patients who use their drugs, and 594 groups in the database received donations from pharmaceutical companies. Fifteen patient groups relied on pharmaceutical companies for at least 20 percent of their revenue in the same year, and some received more than half of their revenue from pharmaceutical companies. Recipients of donations from pharmaceutical companies include the American Diabetes Association, Susan G. Komen, and the Caring Ambassadors Program.

Patient opinion leaders, also sometimes called patient advocates, are individuals who are well versed in a disease, either as patients themselves or as caretakers, and share their knowledge on the particular disease with others. Such POLs can have an influence on health care providers and may help persuade them to use evidence-based therapies or medications in the management of other patients. Identifying such people and persuading them is one goal of market access groups at pharmaceutical and medical device companies.

Organizations

Professional groups
 Solace
 Solace is a professional organization where private advocates can list their business and allow consumers to book conversations with advocates directly. 
 Alliance of Professional Health Advocates
 The Alliance of Professional Health Advocates (APHA) is an international membership organization for private, professional patient advocates, and those who are exploring the possibility of becoming private advocates. It provides business support such as legal, insurance and marketing. It also offers a public directory of member advocates called AdvoConnection. Following the 2011 death of Ken Schueler — a charter member of the APHA, described as "the Father of Private Patient Advocacy" — the organization established the H. Kenneth Schueler Patient Advocacy Compass Award. The award recognizes excellence in private practice including the use of best practices, community outreach, support of the profession and professional ethics.
 Dialysis Patient Citizens
 Dialysis Patient Citizens is a patient-led, non-profit organization dedicated to improving dialysis citizens' quality of life by advocating for favorable public policy. One of DPC's goals is to provide dialysis patients with the education, access and confidence to be their own advocates. Through their grassroots advocacy campaigns, Patient Ambassador program; Washington, DC patient fly-ins; conference calls and briefings, DPC works to train effective advocates for dialysis-related issues. Membership is free.
 National Association of Healthcare Advocacy Consultants
 National Association of Healthcare Advocacy Consultants (NAHAC) is a nonprofit organization located in Berkeley, California. Joanna Smith founded NAHAC on July 15, 2009 as a broad-based, grassroots organization for health care and patient advocacy. To that end, it is a multi-stakeholder organization, with membership open to the general public.
 National Patient Advocate Foundation
 The National Patient Advocate Foundation is a non-profit organization in the United States dedicated to "...improving access to, and reimbursement for, high-quality healthcare through regulatory and legislative reform at the state and federal levels." The National Patient Advocate Foundation was founded simultaneously with the non-profit Patient Advocate Foundation, "...which provides professional case management services to Americans with chronic, life-threatening and debilitating illnesses."
 Patient Advocates Australia
 Patient Advocates Australia, founded by Dorothy Kamaker, is a support option for consumers of aged, health and disability care in Australia.   For the elderly, an emerging need has arisen for patient advocacy in residential aged facilities. The Aged Care Royal Commission Report published in 2021 has made recommendations regarding a need for vigilant advocacy for residents of nursing homes to protect them against rampant abuse and neglect with one submission calling for the routine provision of independent patient advocates. For the disabled, funding for support to overcome healthcare barriers is available through the NDIS. 
 Greater National Advocates (GNA)
 Greater National Advocatesis a non-profit organization with a goal to wake up the nation to the lifesaving benefits of Independent Patient Advocacy and provide patients and loved ones with immediate online access to a trusted network of qualified practitioners. GNA uses fact-based media to spread awareness and steer patients and their loved ones to GNANOW.org where they can learn more and find the professional support they need.

Center for Patient Partnerships
Founded in 2000, the interprofessional Center for Patient Partnerships (CPP) at University of Wisconsin–Madison offers a health advocacy certificate with a focus on either patient advocacy or system-level health policy advocacy. The book chapter "Educating for Health Advocacy in Settings of Higher Education" describes CPP's pedagogy and curriculum.

Government agencies

United States
In the United States, state governmental units have established ombudsmen to investigate and respond to patient complaints and to provide other consumer services.
 New York
 In New York, the Office of Patient Advocacy within the New York State Office of Alcoholism and Substance Abuse Services (OASAS) is responsible for protecting the rights of patients in OASAS-certified programs. The office answers questions from patients and their families; provides guidance for health care professionals on topics related to patient rights, state regulations, and treatment standards, and intervenes to resolve problems that cannot be handled within treatment programs themselves.
 California
 In California, the Office of the Patient Advocate (OPA), an independent state office established in July 2000 in conjunction with the Department of Managed Health Care, is responsible for the creation and distribution of educational materials for consumers, public outreach, evaluation and ranking of health care service plans, collaboration with patient assistance programs, and policy development for government health regulation.
Such state government offices may also be responsible for intervening in disputes within the legal and insurance systems and in disciplinary actions against health care professionals. Some hospitals, health insurance companies, and other health care organizations also employ people specifically to assume the role of patient advocate. Within hospitals, the person may have the title of Ombudsman or Patient Representative.

See also

Geriatric care management
Ombudsman
Organizational ombudsman
Patient empowerment

References 

 
Medical ethics
Nursing ethics